Donald Roy King (born October 9, 1947) is an American television director, and also a producer, writer, and actor. He served as the director for Saturday Night Live from 2006 until 2021. He has "directed more hours of live network television than anyone else in the history of television," according to Michael Chein.
 
He has won a number of Emmys, among other awards.

Early life
King is a native of Pitcairn, Pennsylvania. He grew up in both Monroeville and Pitcairn, and initially wanted to go into acting. His father worked as a mailman, with both his parents supporting his interests in sports and the arts.  King was active as an athlete as a young student, and also directed classmates in small plays. He initially planned on attending West Point, with a medical exam later finding something wrong with his back and preventing him from applying. In eighth grade, he traveled with classmates to New York to see several Broadway musicals, with King developing a "crush" on New York City, aiming to eventually have a career there.

He attended Gateway High School, graduating in 1965, and Pennsylvania State University, graduating in 1969 with a degree in broadcasting. He graduated Penn State's Bellisario College of Communications. He initially studied for a degree in broadcast journalism, and also was involved with the school's theater department. He first directed a project during the last class of a broadcasting course, comparing it to playing quarterback on a football team. He also had an amateur boxing career.

Career

Early career 
Early in his career, King wanted to be an actor, and also became a director at a local station in Pittsburgh. He then became a director at several bigger stations in Pennsylvania. Aiming to eventually work in New York, he moved to a station in San Jose, then to a larger station in Pittsburgh, then moving on to direct at Channel 5 in New York. King directed morning news television for around two decades, first at ABC's Good Morning America and later CBS This Morning. His other directing work includes Survivor (including the live Survivor finales on CBS), The Early Show, and The Mike Douglas Show. King went on to be nominated for five Daytime Emmys for Outstanding Individual Direction For A Variety Show. He won in 1977 for The Mike Douglas Show, for the episode with Gene Kelly and Fred Astaire appearing together for the first time. At the age of 27 or 28, after already earning an Emmy for directing, he enrolled again in acting classes.

In 1991, he won an Emmy for Outstanding Individual Achievement in Graphic Design for his work on CBS Evening News with Dan Rather. At one point in his career, he was asked to be on a Blue Ribbon Panel for the Emmys, which he recollects gave him an understanding of how subjective it is to discern good directing. His assignments for various networks also took him to "20 countries and 38 states," with King working on productions and directing shows for "morning shows, documentaries, telethons, sporting events, concerts, and musicals." He also had experienced directing a number of sports broadcasts.'

King directed morning television for over twenty years, working on The Early Show, CBS This Morning, and Good Morning America, but by his late fifties, he desired a career change from the genre. Around that time, he was offered the chance to direct Saturday Night Live, which he said he did not expect, as he had no formal experience in directing sketch comedy.

Saturday Night Live 
In 2006, the age of 58, King was hired as the director of Saturday Night Live, becoming the third person to serve as the show's director. He did not play a part in the creation or selection of sketches, but described his job as helping "bring them to life" instead. In 2016, he was the subject of an AARP video profile.

As of 2017, he was in his 11th season with SNL, and had won "six primetime Emmy awards, a daytime Emmy and three awards from the Directors Guild of America." That year, he won best directing for a variety series for an episode hosted by Jimmy Fallon.

He has been nominated for thirteen Directors Guild of America awards, which he won in 2014, 2016, 2017, 2018 and 2019.

In 2010, he consulted on the film Morning Glory, where "he ensured that the TV scene was depicted accurately," and also played Merv the Director. Between 2008 and 2018, he won an Emmy every year. By 2018, he had received nine Emmy Awards, eight Primetime and one Daytime, and five Directors Guild of America awards. In 2015 and 2016, he lost out to the Daily Show and Inside Amy Schumer. In 2018, he was nominated for Outstanding Directing for a Variety Series, again for SNL, winning. The next year, he won Outstanding Directing for a Variety Series again at the Primetime Emmy Awards. At that point he had 28 Emmy nominations. In 2018, he played himself in A Star Is Born.

He is the recipient of 10 Emmy awards and 19 nominations. His work on Saturday Night Live has earned him nine Primetime Emmys and 13 nominations.  In January 2020, King won the Directors Guild of America Award for Variety/Talk/News/Sports - Regularly Scheduled Programming for Saturday Night Live. He retired from the show in 2021, during its 47th season.

Broadway Worldwide 
He has spoken about the television industry at events and schools such as Lawrence Herbert School of Communication and Berkeley Forum. When not working on SNL and live version of Weekend Update in August, King is involved in various stage plays and musicals. Among projects he has worked on are Broadway version of Romeo and Juliet and Memphis. King is the creative director of Broadway Worldwide which brings theatrical events to theaters and television. The company has produced four major productions as of 2019, all of which King directed: Smokey Joe's Cafe, Putting It Together with Carol Burnett, Jekyll & Hyde, and Memphis. He also directed a big screen taping of Broadway's Romeo and Juliet with Orlando Bloom in 2013.

Personal life 
King lives in New York City, and has a daughter named Cameron. He married actress Kate Snyder in 1995 after a prior marriage ended in divorce.

Filmography

Awards and nominations

References

External links
 
 Don Roy King interviewed on Conversations from Penn State
 

1947 births
American television directors
CBS News people
Daytime Emmy Award winners
Directors Guild of America Award winners
Living people
Donald P. Bellisario College of Communications alumni
People from Monroeville, Pennsylvania
People from Pitcairn, Pennsylvania
Primetime Emmy Award winners